Degeneration is deterioration in the medical sense.  Generally, it is the change from a higher to a lower form.  More specifically, it is the change of tissue to a lower or less functionally active form.  
True degeneration: when there is actual chemical change of the tissue itself.
Infiltration: when the change consists of the deposit of abnormal matter in the tissues
Degenerative disease

See also
Macular degeneration
Neurodegenerative disease

References
Dorland's Illustrated Medical Dictionary (Twenty-sixth Edition) 

Medical terminology